1925 in sports describes the year's events in world sport.

American football
 NFL championship – Chicago Cardinals (11–2–1)
 Chicago was awarded the championship controversially because the Maroons had been suspended from the NFL for playing an exhibition game against a group of Notre Dame All-Stars.
 Five new teams join the NFL: New York Giants, Detroit Panthers, Providence Steam Roller, a new Canton Bulldogs team and the Pottsville Maroons.
 Rose Bowl (1924 season):
 The Notre Dame Fighting Irish won 27–10 over the Stanford Indians to win the college football national championship
 Dartmouth Big Green – college football national championship shared with Alabama Crimson Tide
 3 October – Texas Technological College (now Texas Tech) plays its inaugural intercollegiate football game.

Association football
Events
 The IFAB reforms the offside law, reducing the number of opposing players required to be in front of the attacker for him to be onside from three to two.
England
 The Football League – Huddersfield Town 58 points, West Bromwich Albion 56, Bolton Wanderers 55, Liverpool 50, Bury 49, Newcastle United 48
 FA Cup final – Sheffield United 1–0 Cardiff City at Empire Stadium, Wembley, London
Germany
 National Championship – 1. FC Nürnberg (0–0) 1–0 FSV Frankfurt at Frankfurt
Greece
Olympiacos F.C., officially founded in Athens.
Russia
 FC Zenit Saint Petersburg, officially founded on May 30.(former Zenit Lenninglad in Soviet Union)

Australian rules football
VFL Premiership
 Geelong wins the 29th VFL Premiership: Geelong 10.19 (79) d Collingwood 9.15 (69) at Melbourne Cricket Ground (MCG)
Brownlow Medal
 The annual Brownlow Medal is awarded to Colin Watson (St Kilda)
Events
 Footscray, Hawthorn and North Melbourne join the league from the VFA

Bandy
Sweden
 Championship final – IF Göta 7-5 Västerås SK

Baseball
World Series
 7–15 October — Pittsburgh Pirates (NL) defeats Washington Senators (AL) to win the 1925 World Series by 4 games to 3.  The Pirates are the first team to win a Series in a comeback down three games to one.
Negro leagues
 Hilldale (ECL) defeats Kansas City Monarchs (NNL) 5 games to 1 in the 1925 Colored World Series
Mexico
 Mexican Baseball League, a first officially game held on June 28.

Basketball
Events
The American Basketball League is formed as the first major league of professional basketball.

Boxing
Events
 15 January — Benny Leonard, arguably the greatest-ever lightweight champion, retires from boxing to leave the World Lightweight Championship temporarily vacant
 2 July — World Middleweight Champion Harry Greb outpoints World Welterweight Champion Mickey Walker over 15 rounds in one of the all-time great boxing matches at New York's Polo Grounds.
 14 July — death of current World Flyweight Champion Pancho Villa from blood poisoning after a dental operation goes wrong.
Lineal world champions
 World Heavyweight Championship – Jack Dempsey
 World Light Heavyweight Championship – Mike McTigue → Paul Berlenbach
 World Middleweight Championship – Harry Greb
 World Welterweight Championship – Mickey Walker
 World Lightweight Championship – Benny Leonard → vacant → Jimmy Goodrich → Rocky Kansas
 World Featherweight Championship – vacant → Louis "Kid" Kaplan
 World Bantamweight Championship – Eddie "Cannonball" Martin → Charley Phil Rosenberg
 World Flyweight Championship – Pancho Villa → vacant

Canadian football
Grey Cup
 13th Grey Cup in the Canadian Football League – Ottawa Senators defeat Winnipeg Tammany Tigers 24–1 at Lansdowne Park

Cricket
Events
 Marylebone Cricket Club organises an England tour of Australia in the 1924–25 season.  Australia retains The Ashes by winning the five-match Test series 4–1.
England
 County Championship – Yorkshire
 Minor Counties Championship – Buckinghamshire
 Most runs – Jack Hobbs 3024 @ 70.32 (HS 266*)
 Most wickets – Maurice Tate 228 @ 14.97 (BB 8–91)
 Wisden Cricketer of the Year – Jack Hobbs
Australia
 Sheffield Shield – Victoria
 Most runs – Herbert Sutcliffe 1250 @ 69.44 (HS 188)
 Most wickets – Maurice Tate 77 @ 19.01 (BB 7–74)
India
 Bombay Quadrangular – Muslims
New Zealand
 Plunket Shield – Otago
South Africa
 Currie Cup – Western Province
West Indies
 Inter-Colonial Tournament – Trinidad and Tobago

Cycling
Tour de France
 Ottavio Bottecchia (Italy) wins the 19th Tour de France

Figure skating
World Figure Skating Championships
 World Women's Champion – Herma Szabo (Austria)
 World Men's Champion – Willi Böckel (Austria)
 World Pairs Champions – Herma Szabo and Ludwig Wrede (Austria)

Golf
Major tournaments
 British Open – Jim Barnes
 US Open – Willie Macfarlane
 USPGA Championship – Walter Hagen
Other tournaments
 British Amateur – Robert Harris
 US Amateur – Bobby Jones

Horse racing
England
 Cheltenham Gold Cup – Ballinode
 Grand National – Double Chance
 1,000 Guineas Stakes – Saucy Sue
 2,000 Guineas Stakes – Manna
 The Derby – Manna
 The Oaks – Saucy Sue
 St. Leger Stakes – Solario
Australia
 Melbourne Cup – Windbag
Canada
 King's Plate – Fairbank
France
 Prix de l'Arc de Triomphe – Priori
Ireland
 Irish Grand National – Dog Fox
 Irish Derby Stakes – Zionist  
USA
 Kentucky Derby – Flying Ebony
 Preakness Stakes – Coventry
 Belmont Stakes – American Flag

Ice hockey
Stanley Cup
 21–30 March — Victoria Cougars defeats Montreal Canadiens in the 1925 Stanley Cup Finals.  The Cougars are the last non-NHL team to win the Cup.
Events
 The first-place Hamilton Tigers of the NHL go on strike for an increase in pay. The team is suspended and the players sold to become the New York Americans.
 2 December — the expansion New York Americans and Pittsburgh Pirates of the NHL play their first-ever game against each other at Pittsburgh. The Americans defeat the Pirates 2–1 in overtime.
 15 December — the first NHL game is played at Madison Square Garden between the New York Americans and the Montreal Canadiens. The Canadiens win the game 3-1 and are awarded the Prince of Wales Trophy.

Motorsport

Multi-sport events
Far Eastern Championship Games
 The 7th Far Eastern Championship Games are held at Manila, Philippine Islands

Nordic skiing
FIS Nordic World Ski Championships

The inaugural world championships are held at Johannisbad in Czechoslovakia for men only.  Winners are:
 Cross-country skiing (18 km) – Otakar Německý (Czechoslovakia)
 Cross-country skiing (50 km) – František Donth (Czechoslovakia)
 Nordic combined (individual) – Otakar Německý (Czechoslovakia)
 Ski jumping (individual large hill) – Willen Dick (Czechoslovakia)

Rowing
The Boat Race
 28 March — Cambridge wins the 77th Oxford and Cambridge Boat Race

Rugby league
England
 Championship – Hull Kingston Rovers
 Challenge Cup final – Oldham 16–3 Hull Kingston Rovers at Headingley Rugby Stadium, Leeds 
 Lancashire League Championship – Swinton
 Yorkshire League Championship – Hull Kingston Rovers
 Lancashire County Cup – Oldham 10–0 St Helens Recs 
 Yorkshire County Cup – Wakefield Trinity 9–8 Batley
Australia
 NSW Premiership – South Sydney (outright winner)

Rugby union
Five Nations Championship
 38th Five Nations Championship series is won by Scotland who complete the Grand Slam

Speed skating
Speed Skating World Championships
 Men's All-round Champion – Clas Thunberg (Finland)

Tennis
Australia
 Australian Men's Singles Championship – James Anderson (Australia) defeats Gerald Patterson (Australia) 11–9 2–6 6–2 6–3
 Australian Women's Singles Championship – Daphne Akhurst Cozens (Australia) defeats Esna Boyd Robertson (Australia) 1–6 8–6 6–4 
England
 Wimbledon Men's Singles Championship – René Lacoste (France) defeats Jean Borotra (France) 6–3 6–3 4–6 8–6
 Wimbledon Women's Singles Championship – Suzanne Lenglen (France) defeats Joan Fry Lakeman (Great Britain) 6–2 6–0
France
 French Men's Singles Championship – René Lacoste (France) defeats Jean Borotra (France) 7–5 6–1 6–4
 French Women's Singles Championship – Suzanne Lenglen (France) defeats Kitty McKane Godfree (Great Britain) 6–1 6–2
USA
 American Men's Singles Championship – Bill Tilden (USA) defeats Bill Johnston (USA) 4–6 11–9 6–3 4–6 6–3 
 American Women's Singles Championship – Helen Wills Moody (USA) defeats Kitty McKane Godfree (Great Britain) 3–6 6–0 6–2
Davis Cup
 1925 International Lawn Tennis Challenge –  5–0  at Germantown Cricket Club (grass) Philadelphia, United States

Gymnastics 
The wheel was invented in 1925 by German Otto Feick in Schönau an der Brend.

References

 
Sports by year